William Robertson House, also known as Wampee Plantation Summer House, is a historic home located at Pinopolis, Berkeley County, South Carolina. It was built about 1844, and is a two-story, three bay, frame I-House, sheathed in weatherboard. It features a hip roofed, one-story porch spanning the façade and wrapping around the right elevation.  The house was one of the early planters' retreats in the pineland village of Pinopolis.

It was listed in the National Register of Historic Places in 1982.

References

Houses on the National Register of Historic Places in South Carolina
Houses completed in 1844
Houses in Berkeley County, South Carolina
National Register of Historic Places in Berkeley County, South Carolina